Enrique Garza Tamez (born 12 May 1956)  has had a wide influence on civil service administration in the state of Tamaulipas, Mexico.

His political and administrative offices have included:
Deputy Director of State Property.
Secretary of the City Hall of Victoria.
Director of Crime Prevention, appointed by the State Governor.
Legal adviser of the Executive Local Meeting of the IFE.
Committee representative for planning the development of the State.
Local representative in the 56th Legislature.
Director of State Legal Issues, appointed by the State Governor.
President of the Colosio Foundation, A.C.
Federal representative in the 58th Legislature of the House of Representatives.

Currently, he is General Secretary of the state Congress in Tamaulipas. He has a Law degree from the Universidad Autónoma de Nuevo León (UANL) and a Master of Public Administration from the Universidad Autónoma de Tamaulipas (UAT). He has published: Las Elecciones en Tamaulipas, Fundamentos Jurídicos (or Judicial Foundations of the Tamaulipas Elections) (1992); La Reforma del '95 (or Legal Reforms of 1995) (1995) and Leyes y Reglamentos de Tamaulipas 1921-2003 (or Laws and Regulations of Tamaulipas) (2003).

References 

Living people
1956 births
Members of the Congress of Tamaulipas
Members of the Chamber of Deputies (Mexico)
Institutional Revolutionary Party politicians
Autonomous University of Nuevo León alumni
Autonomous University of Tamaulipas alumni
21st-century Mexican politicians
Politicians from Tamaulipas
People from Ciudad Victoria